The 1914 German football championship, the 12th edition of the competition, was won by SpVgg Fürth, defeating VfB Leipzig 3–2 after extra time in the final. It was the last edition of the championship before the First World War, with the next edition not held until after the war in 1920.

For SpVgg Fürth it was the first national championship won with two more to follow in 1926 and 1929 as well as a losing appearance in the 1920 final. VfB Leipzig, the first-ever German champions in 1903, had also won the 1906 and 1913 editions as well as making a losing appearance in 1911 and was the most successful club in the pre-First World War era of the competition.

Fürth's Karl Franz was the top scorer of the 1914 championship with five goals.

Eight clubs qualified for the competition played in knock-out format, the champions of each of the seven regional football championships as well as the defending German champions.

Overview
The German championship final was contested by SpVgg Fürth and VfB Leipzig with the former winning its first national championship. The final lasted for an historic 153 minutes, until SpVgg scored the winning goal, the longest game in German football history. Fürth took an early lead and Leipzig lost a player through a broken leg just before half time, unable to bring on a substitute as substitutions were not allowed in those days. Nevertheless, Leipzig equalised in the 83rd minute, forcing extra time. Fürth once more took the lead but Leipzig equalised again four minutes later. After 120 minutes the game stood at two all and the rules stipulated that the game was to be continued in 10-minute blocks of extra time until a winner was determined. A red card for Fürth player Hans Schmidt in the 138 minute put both clubs at an equal number of ten players again. The game was finally decided in the 153rd minute when Karl Franz scored the winning goal for SpVgg Fürth.

Qualified teams
The teams qualified through the regional championships:

Competition

Quarter-finals
The quarter-finals, played on 3 May 1914:

|}

Semi-finals
The semi-finals, played on 17 May 1914:

|}

Final

References

Sources
 kicker Allmanach 1990, by kicker, page 160 to 178 – German championship
 Süddeutschlands Fussballgeschichte in Tabellenform 1897-1988  History of Southern German football in tables, publisher & author: Ludolf Hyll

External links
 German Championship 1913–14 at weltfussball.de 
 German Championship 1914 at RSSSF

German football championship seasons
1
German